Willow Peak or Ras es-Safsafeh is a mountain in the Sinai Peninsula. The mountain peak overlooks Saint Catherine's Monastery, and is situated approximately 1km to the west.

Christian tradition considers the mountain to be the biblical Mount Horeb.

References

Mountains of Egypt